An anarchist is an adherent of the philosophy of anarchism, or someone who disregards laws and social norms.

Anarchist or Anarchists may also refer to:

Literature 
 The Anarchist (newspaper), a monthly newspaper produced in London, England between 1885 and 1888
 Die Anarchisten, an 1891 semi-fictional book by John Henry Mackay
 The Anarchists (book), a 1964 history of anarchism by James Joll
 The Anarchist (play), a two-person 2012 play by David Mamet
 Anarchist (comics), a Marvel Comics character

Film 
 Anarchists (film), a 2000 action film
 Les Anarchistes (English: The Anarchists), a 2015 French film

Music 
 "The Anarchists", a 1968 song by Léo Ferré

See also 
 Anarchism (disambiguation)
 Anarchy (disambiguation)